Osman Nuri Pasha (‎; 1832, Tokat, Ottoman Empire – 4 to 5 April 1900, Constantinople, Ottoman Empire), also known as Ghazi Osman Pasha, was an Ottoman field marshal. Being one of the most respected and decorated Ottoman pashas of all time, many songs have been written for him, and many places have been named after him. This is mainly because he held the Bulgarian town of Plevna for five months against superior Russo-Romanian forces in 1877 during the Russo-Turkish War, though the city eventually fell.

Early life and education

Osman Nuri was born into the prominent Turkish Yağcıoğulları family of the city of Tokat. His father was a civil worker who, soon after Osman's birth, was appointed to a position in the Ottoman capital, so the family moved to Constantinople (now Istanbul).

Osman attended the Beşiktaş Military High School and then graduated from the Ottoman Military College in 1852 as a Lieutenant, entering the Cavalry Arm at the beginning of the Crimean War.

Military career
He entered the Cavalry Arm at the beginning and served in the Crimean War, where his bravery secured him a promotion as First Lieutenant. After the end of the war, Osman was appointed to the General Staff and, a year later, had risen to the rank of Captain with the title of Bey. In 1859 he was appointed as a military representative in the forming of the cadastral and census map of the Ottoman Empire, a job he fulfilled for the next two years.

In 1861, Osman was sent to Beirut Vilayet, where a rebellion had been started by Yusuf Ekrem in Syria. In 1866 he was dispatched to another troubled area of the Empire, Crete, which was engulfed in a massive revolt. His efforts there were noticed by Serdar-ı Ekrem Omar Pasha, so he was promoted to Colonel and awarded the Order of the Medjidie, Third Class Order (Gold). His next appointment was Yemen, in 1868, where he was promoted to the rank of Major-General with the title of Pasha, but also caught a disease which forced him to return to Constantinople in 1871.

After a few months of rest, he was placed in charge of the Third Army in Rumelia. In 1873 he became a Lieutenant General and returned for a short while to Constantinople, before being sent to Scutari and later to Bosnia. His appointment there didn't last long because he couldn't get along with the local governor, Derviş Pasha, so he was moved to the Fourth Army. In 1876, the Principality of Serbia proclaimed its independence and declared war on the Ottoman Empire. Osman Pasha, who had at that time his headquarters at Vidin, defeated the Serbian Army, but in April 1877 Russia declared war on the Ottomans. The Russian troops crossed the Danube into Bulgaria and Osman, with his army of 15,000 men and 174 cannons, was tasked with protecting the important fortress of Nikopol. Before he could get there, the city fell on 16 July after the Battle of Nikopol.

Osman knew that the Russian's next objective would be to cross the Balkan, the last important natural obstacle before Constantinople itself, but they could not risk that if they had a strong enemy force behind them. So he moved his army 20 miles south of Nikopol, at Plevna, a small town surrounded by hills and ravines. The first Russian attack was easily repulsed on 20 July. 

After that, Osman set about preparing for the next attack. He took advantage of the natural landscape and built a strong network of forts, trench lines, and redoubts that enabled him to fully use his superior armament (his troops had Krupp breech-loading artillery, long range Peabody-Martini rifles and Winchester repeaters, which severely outgunned and outranged the Russians). He also received 5,000 soldiers as reinforcements. On 30 July the Russians attacked again only to lose over 7,000 soldiers (almost a third of the attacking force). By now, with the Russian forces severely depleted and demoralized, Osman Pasha could have launched a counterattack that would have endangered the whole Russian army south of the Danube, but he chose to obey his orders and instead defended Plevna. 

The Russians were quick to recover. Grand Duke Nicholas, commander of the Russian troops, sent an urgent telegram to Prince Carol I of the newly independent Principality of Romania asking for Romanian support. The Romanian Army sent 40,000 soldiers with 112 guns, modern Krupp pieces equal to those of the Ottomans, and Carol I was named commander of the joint Russian-Romanian troops around Plevna. By now, the Allied Army numbered 80,000 soldiers against an Ottoman force of around 40,000. Against Carol's wishes, the Allies launched another large scale attack on Plevna on 11 September. After two days of fighting, even though the Allies had managed to dislodge the Ottomans from a few of the redoubts, almost all of them were recaptured, with the exception of Grivitza 1, taken by the Romanian soldiers. 

The Allies could not withstand such severe casualties, so they settled in for a siege and fully surrounded Plevna. Osman Pasha asked for permission to withdraw before the encirclement was complete, but he was denied. By December, with food and ammunition running low and his troops suffering from starvation, cold and disease, Osman knew he could not hold on throughout the winter and that no help from outside was available. Instead of surrendering, he chose to try and break through the siege lines. On 9 December, the Ottoman army attacked a sector of the Russian line and nearly broke through. But the Russians recovered and closed the breach after bitter hand-to-hand fighting, driving the Ottomans back. But the enveloped army could not return to Plevna because during the engagement with the Russian forces, the Romanian army had stormed the defenses protecting their rear, making a withdrawal to the fortifications impossible. Furthermore, Osman was wounded in the leg by a bullet and his troops panicked, thinking that he had died. With his army caught between the Allies, Osman Pasha had no choice but to capitulate surrender to Mihail Cerchez.

In 1878, after the Treaty of Berlin was signed on 13 July, which recognized an autonomous Principality of Bulgaria and the independence of the Principality of Romania, the Principality of Serbia and the Principality of Montenegro from the Ottoman Empire, he returned from Russian captivity and received a hero's welcome in Constantinople. He was awarded the title of Gazi ("warrior" or "veteran" or "victorious") for gallantry and promoted to the rank of Field Marshal. In addition to his Adjutancy title, Osman received the Order of the Medjidiye, First Class Order (Gold), and the Imtiyaz Medal in Gold for his services to the Empire. He was made Marshal of the Palace by the Sultan and the Ottoman military anthem, still used today by Turkey, called Plevna March was composed for his achievements in Plevna. He would go on serving as War Minister on four occasions.

On the night of 4 to 5 April 1900, he died in Constantinople. He was buried next to the Mosque of Fatih Sultan Mehmet as he requested. His tomb was personally commissioned by Abdülhamit II, who regarded him as one of his greatest generals. He is still revered in Turkey today as a sort of tragic hero who displayed gallant perseverance in the face of hopeless odds, and a Turkish flag is often seen draped on his tomb.

Siege of Plevna
During the Russian attack on Nikopol, Osman Pasha was in Vidin with his army. The Ottoman high command ordered Osman Pasha to reinforce Nikopol with 20,000 soldiers. While Osman was on his way to Nikopol, the city fell to the Russians on 16 July 1877. The Russians, knowing that Osman Pasha was heading to Nikopol, planned to intercept and attack his forces. Osman Pasha's troops were 20 miles away from Nikopol. Osman Pasha quickly created a strong network of fortifications, raising earthworks with redoubts, digging trenches and gun emplacements. On 19 July, Russian troops reached Plevna and started bombarding the town. The next day Russian troops continued the bombardment, eventually forcing some Ottoman units off the outer defences.  

Reinforcements began arriving to both sides, as fighting intensified, and the Russians launched an assault. During the first assault, the Russians suffered 4,000 casualties, while the Ottomans suffered 1,000. After this, Osman Pasha strengthened his defences. The Russians were reinforced by the army of Prince Carol I of Romania, who assumed command of the attacking army. On 31 July the Russians attacked Plevna again, but Ottoman troops managed to repulse the assault. After this second engagement, the Russians lost 10.000 men, while Ottomans lost 2,000. After suffering heavy casualties during the assault, the Russians sent out scouts, and resolved to cut off the Ottoman supply lines. To this end, Russian forces attacked the Ottoman garrison at Lovcha. This attack proved to be successful, and the Russians were able to cut off all communications and supply lines to Plevna. By now, Osman Pasha's army had been reinforced to 30,000, while the Russian forces numbered 100,000. On 11 September, the Russians resumed the artillery bombardment, and mounted another assault. The assault succeeded in taking a few redoubts but Osman Pasha retook most of them. After the third battle, the Russians lost roughly 20,000 men, while the Ottomans lost only 5,000.
Since the beginning of the war, Russian and Romanian losses reached up to 50,000.
As more Russian and Romanian troops joined the siege, all attacks were halted. General Eduard Ivanovich Todleben came to see the situation of the siege. He was experienced in siege warfare, and decided to encircle the city.

The Russian-Romanian army closed in by 24 October, as supplies began to run low in the city. On 9 December, Osman Pasha decided to attempt replay attack and attacked the Russian contingent during the night. Close-quarters combat ensued, but the Russian forces outnumbered the Ottomans. Osman Pasha's troops were driven back and he was struck in the leg by a stray bullet. Rumors of Osman Pasha's death spread panic, and Ottoman troops were driven back and enveloped by Romanian forces. At the end of the breakout attempt, the Ottomans had lost 4,000, while the Russians lost 2,000. The next day, Osman Pasha capitulated, surrendering the city to the Romanian Colonel Mihail Cerchez.

In Popular Culture
Minnesota based heavy metal band Kostnatění covered the Plevne March, composed in memory of Gazi Osman Pasha, on their EP "Oheň hoří tam, kde padl" (Fire burns where it falls) released in 2022.

References

Bibliography
 Parry Melanie (ed.) (1997) "Osman Nuri Pasha" Chambers Biographical Dictionary (6th ed.) Larousse Kingfisher Chambers, New York,  ;
 Dupuy, Trevor N.; Johnson, Curt; and Bongard, David L. (1992) "Osman Nuri Pasha" Harper Encyclopedia of Military Biography HarperCollins Publishers, New York,  ;
 ; reprinted 1990 by Ministry of Culture, Ankara,  ;
 Hülagü, M. Metin (1993) Gazi Osman Paşa, 1833–1900: askeri ve siyasi hayatı Boğaziçi Yayınları, Istanbul,  ;
 Murray, Nicholas. “Nuri Osman Pasha,” Conflict and Conquest in the Islamic World: An Encyclopedia, edited by Alexander Mikaberidze. Santa Barbara, CA: ABC-CLIO, 2011. 
 Murray, Nicholas. The Rocky Road to the Great War: The Evolution of Trench Warfare to 1914. Potomac Books Inc. (an imprint of the University of Nebraska Press), 2013.
 Yenice, İhsan and Fidan, Raşit (2001) Plevne kahramanı Gazi Osman Paşa, 1833–1900 Gaziosmanpaşa Belediyesi Kültür Yayınları, İstanbul, ISBN none;
 Uçar, Nail (1978) Gazi Osman Paşa ve Plevne Orkun Yayınevi, Istanbul, ISBN none;

External links

Baumann, Robert F. "Leadership at Plevna, 11-12 September 1877" Studies In Battle Command U.S. Army Command and General Staff College, Fort Leavenworth, KS;
 The anthem of Ghazi Osman Pacha by the Ottoman Mehteran

1832 births
1900 deaths
People from Tokat
Ottoman Military Academy alumni
Ottoman Military College alumni
Ottoman Army generals
Ottoman prisoners of war
Pashas
Civil servants from the Ottoman Empire
Field marshals of the Ottoman Empire
Ottoman military personnel of the Russo-Turkish War (1877–1878)
Serbian–Turkish Wars (1876–1878)
Prisoners of war held by Russia